Daulat Daroda is an Indian politician and MLA of Maharashtra Legislative Assembly. He was reelected in 2019 from the  Shahapur Vidhan Sabha constituency in Thane district.

Positions Held
 1995: Elected to Maharashtra Legislative Assembly
 1999: Elected to Maharashtra Legislative Assembly
 2009: Elected to Maharashtra Legislative Assembly
 2019: Elected to Maharashtra Legislative Assembly

References 

People from Thane district
Shiv Sena politicians
Members of the Maharashtra Legislative Assembly
Living people
Marathi politicians
Year of birth missing (living people)
Nationalist Congress Party politicians